Branden Fitelson (born August 17, 1969) is an American philosopher and Distinguished Professor of Philosophy at Northeastern University.

He is known for his expertise on formal epistemology and philosophy of science.

Bibliography 
 Edward N. Zalta and Branden Fitelson, "Steps Toward a Computational Metaphysics", Journal of Philosophical Logic 36(2) (April 2007): 227–247.

See also
Evolutionary argument against naturalism
Minimal axioms for Boolean algebra

References

External links

Branden Fitelson at Northeastern University
Branden Fitelson: The Wason Task(s) and the Paradox of Confirmation

21st-century American philosophers
Analytic philosophers
Philosophy academics
University of Wisconsin–Madison alumni
Northeastern University faculty
Living people
American logicians
1969 births
People from Syracuse, New York
Mathematicians from New York (state)
Distinguished professors of philosophy